Oswald Tippo (November 27, 1911 – June 10, 1999) was an American botanist and educator. Tippo became the first chancellor of the University of Massachusetts Amherst in 1970.

Career
Born in Milo, Tippo moved to Boston a year later, and graduated from Jamaica Plain High School in 1928. He received his Bachelor of Science in botany from the University of Massachusetts Amherst (1932) and his Master of Science (1933) and Doctor of Philosophy from Harvard University (1937). He was also awarded an honorary Doctor of Science from the University of Massachusetts Amherst (1954). Tippo was a member of the Phi Beta Kappa and Sigma Xi honor societies.

Upon graduating from Harvard, Tippo joined the faculty at the University of Illinois. From 1943 to 1945, he worked as a biologist at the Philadelphia Naval Shipyard. In 1949, Tippo published the widely used textbook College Botany with Harry J. Fuller. From 1951 to 1953, he served as editor of the American Journal of Botany. In 1955, he moved to Yale University as Eaton Professor of Botany, Director of the Marsh Botanical Garden, and Fellow of Berkeley College. Five years later, he was named provost of the University of Colorado, and in 1963, was named Executive Dean of Arts and Sciences at New York University.

From 1964 to 1970, Tippo served as provost of the University of Massachusetts Amherst, and then became the institution's first chancellor until 1971. He is credited with initiating the construction of their W. E. B. Du Bois Library, and the library's courtyard was named in his honor on October 8, 1999. Tippo was named Commonwealth Professor of Botany from 1971 until his retirement in 1982. From 1980 to 1985, he served as editor of the journal Economic Botany.

Tippo was president of the Botanical Society of America in 1955, fellow of the American Academy of Arts and Sciences, member of the American Association for the Advancement of Science, and member of the American Institute of Biological Science.

Awards
1980 - Botanical Society of America Merit Award
1999 - Siegfried Feller Award for Outstanding Volunteer Service

References

External links

UMass Amherst profile

1911 births
1999 deaths
People from Piscataquis County, Maine
People from Jamaica Plain
University of Massachusetts Amherst College of Natural Sciences alumni
Harvard University alumni
20th-century American botanists
Fellows of the American Academy of Arts and Sciences
Botanical Society of America
University of Illinois faculty
Yale University faculty
University of Colorado faculty
New York University faculty
Leaders of the University of Massachusetts Amherst
20th-century American academics